Liudmyla Avdieienko (born 14 November 1963) is a Belarusian athlete. She competed in the women's high jump at the 1988 Summer Olympics, representing the Soviet Union.

References

1963 births
Living people
Athletes (track and field) at the 1988 Summer Olympics
Belarusian female high jumpers
Olympic athletes of the Soviet Union
Place of birth missing (living people)
Soviet female high jumpers
Universiade medalists in athletics (track and field)
Universiade silver medalists for the Soviet Union